Chocolate balls are a spherical confection made of or dipped into chocolate. Other ingredients may include peanut butter or marzipan.

In Nordic countries, most notably Sweden, Denmark, Finland and Iceland, chokladboll or kokosbollar are chocolate balls mostly covered in coconut. They can also be covered in for example sprinkles.

See also
Bossche bol
Brigadeiro
Buckeye candy

Chocolate-covered foods